Parevia sisenna is a moth of the subfamily Arctiinae first described by Herbert Druce in 1899. It is found in Brazil, Suriname and Peru.

References

Phaegopterina
Moths described in 1899